NGC 3900 is a lenticular galaxy located in the Leo constellation. It was discovered by William Herschel in 1785. It is estimated to be about 95 to 100 light-years away from Earth.

References

External links 
 

Leo (constellation)
3900
Unbarred lenticular galaxies